Thomas Marchese (born September 30, 1987) is an American professional poker player from Parsippany, New Jersey. Marchese lives in Las Vegas, Nevada.

Marchese was the winner of the 2010 Card Player Player of the Year.  During 2010, Marchese made 11 final tables and won the NAPT event at The Venetian.
In 2015, Marchese won back-to-back 'High Roller' events at the Aria casino in Las Vegas, netting $681,876.

As of 2017, Marchese's live tournament winnings exceed $15,700,000.

On 3 July 2019, Marchese won the MILLIONS Vegas event at the Aria Resort and Casino for $1m, the inaugural partypokerLIVE MILLIONS event to be held in the USA. This was Marchese's third cash of $1m or above at the Aria

Notes

Living people
American poker players
1987 births